Mary Rice may refer to:

 Mary Sophia Hyde Rice (1816–1911), American missionary
 Mary Livermore (1820–1905), née Mary Rice, American journalist
 Mary Rice (Penelakut Elder) (1855–1949), Penelakut Elder
 Mary Spring Rice (1880–1924), Irish nationalist activist
 Mary Blair Rice (1880–1959), better known as American writer Blair Niles
 Mary E. Rice (born 1926), American invertebrate zoologist
 Mary Rice Hopkins (active 1990–2010), American Christian musician
 Mary Rice (wheelchair racer) (active 1996–2000), Irish paralympic athlete
 Mary Rice, a character in 2008 film Jumper